Ang Pambansang Third Wheel is a 2018 Filipino romantic comedy film written and directed by Ivan Andrew Payawal starring Sam Milby and Yassi Pressman. The film was released in the Philippines on 7 March 2018 in co-production with The IdeaFirst Company.

Plot 
Yassi Pressman as Trina is an unlucky girl when it comes to love, she had been hurt by three men as she always ends up being the third wheel in her every relationship. Later on she meets Sam Milby as Neo an impossibly gorgeous and sincere man who manages to break down her walls until she learns that Neo has a son from his previous relationship. Trina's character finds herself the third wheel again but not in the way she expected.

Cast

References

External links 

2018 films
Viva Films films
Films directed by Ivan Andrew Payawal